Dean E. McHenry (18 October 1910 – 17 March 1998) was an American professor of political science, and the founding chancellor of the University of California, Santa Cruz.

McHenry was born in Lompoc, California north of Santa Barbara, and received his bachelor's degree in political science from UCLA in 1932, and went on to receive a master's degree at Stanford University in 1933 and a Ph.D. at U.C. Berkeley in 1936.

McHenry taught government at Williams College and political science at Pennsylvania State College, and became a member of the faculty of political science at UCLA.  During his time at UCLA, he ran for several political offices, including mayor of Los Angeles and for the United States Congress; he also authored numerous books.

In 1958, he became the academic assistant to his long-time friend Clark Kerr, the then-president of the University of California, and in 1960 he helped Kerr draft California's Master Plan for Higher Education.  The following year he became the first chancellor of the new University of California Santa Cruz, a position he held for 13 years.

In 1958, Kerr, McHenry's former roommate at Stanford, quickly recruited him to the post of academic assistant to the president.

McHenry served on the team that drafted California's Master Plan for Higher Education in 1960.

McHenry and his wife, Jane, had four children, including the noted anthropologist Henry McHenry.

References

External links
 1932 Yearbook Photo
 Photographs of Dean McHenry from the UC Santa Cruz Library's Digital Collections
  Digital Exhibit: Chancellor Dean McHenry, the Political Mastermind behind UC Santa Cruz

1910 births
1998 deaths
American political scientists
Chancellors of the University of California, Santa Cruz
Pennsylvania State University faculty
People from Lompoc, California
People from Santa Cruz, California
Stanford University alumni
University of California, Berkeley alumni
University of California, Los Angeles alumni
Williams College faculty
20th-century American academics
20th-century political scientists